The 2011 Central Arkansas Bears football team represented the University of Central Arkansas in the 2011 NCAA Division I FCS football season. The Bears were led by 12th year head coach Clint Conque and played their home games at Estes Stadium. They are a member of the Southland Conference. They finished the season 9–4, 6–1 in Southland play to finish in second place. They received an at-large bid into the FCS playoffs where they defeated Tennessee Tech in the first round before falling to Montana in the second round.

Estes Stadium had a new playing surface for 2011, a synthetic turf that is stripped purple and gray with black endzones. The field is the third non green field in Division I football behind Bronco Stadium at Boise State of the FBS (blue) and Roos Field at Eastern Washington (red).

Schedule

References

Central Arkansas
Central Arkansas Bears football seasons
Central Arkansas
Central Arkansas Bears football